Adam Rankin Johnson Jr. (March 1,1917 – February 11, 2006) was an American professional baseball player and executive. A pitcher during his active career, he appeared in seven games in Major League Baseball as a member of the Philadelphia Athletics during the early weeks of the  season.

Rankin Jr. attended what is now the University of Texas at El Paso. He appeared in one game for the 1935 Akron Yankees of the Class C Middle Atlantic League, then began his professional baseball career in earnest in 1939 at the Class D level.

Major League trial (1941)
After he won 15 games in the West Texas–New Mexico League in 1940, he received his brief MLB audition the following spring. Pitching exclusively in relief, Johnson earned his only decision, a victory, on April 23, 1941, at Shibe Park. He took over from starting pitcher Nels Potter in the top of the sixth inning with the opposition Washington Senators leading, 6–1. Johnson held Washington off the scoreboard, allowing one hit (a double to Ben Chapman), before exiting the game for a pinch hitter in the bottom of the frame. The man who hit for him, Crash Davis (whose name was adopted in the 1988 film Bull Durham and given to star Kevin Costner), hit a two-run home run, part of a nine-run Philadelphia rally that saw the Athletics pull ahead, 10–6. With Johnson's successor, Tom Ferrick, earning a save, the Athletics triumphed, 11–7, giving Johnson his win.

World War II service and executive career
Johnson's last appearance in the majors came May 12, also against Washington. He spent the rest of 1941 in the minor leagues with the Wilmington Blue Rocks of the Class B Interstate League. He then served in the United States Navy in the Pacific Theatre of World War II, missing four full years before returning to the minor leagues for two more seasons, 1946 and 1947. His 1–0 MLB won–lost record was accompanied by a 3.60 earned run average, with him allowing four earned runs on 14 hits and three bases on balls in ten full innings pitched; he failed to record a strikeout.

Johnson remained in baseball after his playing days as a minor league executive. From 1953 through 1960, he worked in the Williamsport Grays' front office, then was the president of the Double-A Eastern League from 1961 through 1968. He died in Williamsport, Pennsylvania, at the age of 88.

See also
 List of second-generation Major League Baseball players

References

External links

1917 births
2006 deaths
Akron Yankees players
United States Navy personnel of World War II
Baseball players from Arizona
Chattanooga Lookouts players
El Paso Texans players
Major League Baseball pitchers
Midland Cowboys players
Minor league baseball executives
Moline Plow Boys players
People from Gila County, Arizona
People from Pinal County, Arizona
Philadelphia Athletics players
Sportspeople from Williamsport, Pennsylvania
Tucson Cowboys players
Williamsport Grays players
Williamsport Tigers players
Wilmington Blue Rocks (1940–1952) players